Ikki Tousen is an anime television series based on the manga by Yuji Shiozaki, published by Wani Books and serialized in the seinen manga magazine Comic GUM. The anime is produced by J.C. Staff, directed by Takashi Watanabe, series composition by Takao Yoshioka, music by Hiroshi Motokura and Project IKKI, characters by Shinya Hasegawa, and produced by Nobuhiro Osawa and Yuji Matsukura. The series revolves around an all-out turf war in the Kanto region of Japan where fighters from seven schools battle for supremacy, and the story centers on Hakufu Sonsaku, a fighter from the West who transfers to Nanyo Academy. The anime is loosely based on the Chinese novel Romance of the Three Kingdoms, and the characters in the series are based on the characters from the Three Kingdoms novel.

The series aired 13 episodes on AT-X from July 30 to October 22, 2003, with subsequent runs on TVK, Mie TV, Chiba TV, TV Saitama, and Sun Television. The opening theme is "Drivin' Through The Night" by M.o.v.e while the two ending themes are "Let me be with you" by Shela for episodes 1-7, and Fate by Masumi Asano for episodes 8-13. Seven DVD volumes were released by Media Factory between November 22, 2003 and May 25, 2004. A DVD box set was later released on January 25, 2008, and a Blu-ray box set will be released on April 27, 2011. The series was licensed in North America by Geneon Entertainment and Enoki Films, who released the series on four DVD volumes between August 10, 2004 and March 1, 2005. A box set was later released on July 19, 2005 by Geneon. The series is now licensed by Funimation Entertainment, and released a box set of the series on May 26, 2009. The series is also licensed in Australia and New Zealand by Madman Entertainment and in the United Kingdom by MVM Films.

A second season, called , aired 12 episodes on AT-X between February 26, 2007 and May 14, 2007, with subsequent broadcasts on Chiba TV, KBS Kyoto, TV Kanagawa, Tokyo MX, Sun Television, TV Aichi, and TV Saitama. Produced by ARMS, the series is directed by Koichi Ohata, series composition by Takao Yoshioka, music by Yasuharu Takanashi, characters by Rin-Sin, and produced by Osamu Koshinaka, Shinsaku Tanaka, Takuro Hatakeyama, and Yoshikazu Beniya. Six DVD volumes were released by Media Factory between July 25, 2007 and November 22, 2007. The DVD volumes contain an original video animation called , featuring the female cast in a hot spring setting. A DVD box set was later released on December 22, 2009. The anime is licensed in North America by Media Blasters, who released the series on three DVD volumes between November 24, 2009 and April 20, 2010. A box set was later released on August 31, 2010. The anime is also licensed in Australia and New Zealand by Madman Entertainment, as with the first season.

A third season, aired 12 episodes on AT-X between June 11 and August 27, 2008, with subsequent broadcasts on Chiba TV, TV Saitama, TV Aichi, TV Kanagawa, Sun Television, and Tokyo MX. Produced by ARMS, the series is directed by Koichi Ohata, series composition by Masanao Akahoshi, music by Yasuharu Takanashi, characters by Rin Shin, and produced by Hisato Usui, Nobusaku Tanaka, Osamu Ecchu, Takuro Hatakeyama, and Yasuhiro Mikami. Six DVD compilation volumes were released by Media Factory between September 25, 2008 and February 25, 2009, each volume containing an original video animation called . A DVD boxset was released on March 25, 2010. The series was licensed by Media Blasters, as with the second season, but it is now licensed by Funimation Entertainment after they withdrew the license.

A fourth season of the series, called , was announced. Produced by TNK and ARMS, the series is directed and written by Koichi Ohata, music by Yasuharu Takanashi, characters by Rin Shin and Junji Goto, and produced by Hiromasa Minami, Hisato Usui, Keisuke Kawai, Shinsaku Tanaka, and Takuro Hatakeyama. The series aired twelve episodes on AT-X between March 26 and June 11, 2010, with subsequent broadcasts on Chiba TV, TVK, TV Saitama, Tokyo MX, TV Aichi, and Sun Television. Six DVD and Blu-ray volumes were released by Media Factory between June 25 and November 25, 2010. The DVD/BDs contains an original video animation called . Xtreme Xecutor is licensed in North America by Funimation Entertainment, as with the first and third seasons.

An original video animation, called  was announced by Media Factory, and a promotional video was posted on their YouTube channel. The OVA was released in Japanese theaters on November 12, 2011. It was later released on DVD and Blu-ray on February 22, 2012 by Media Factory. Funimation released the DVD box-set of Great Guardians on December 31, 2013. Funimation included the OVA as part of their Xtreme Xecutor DVD Box Set in North America.

A 3-episode OVA titled Ikki Tousen: Western Wolves was released between January 3, 2019 to February 27, 2019. The anime's director is Takashi Watanabe, while Masaya Honda returns as series composition.

It is produced by Arms and directed by Rion Kujo, with scripts written by Masaya Honda, character designs handled by Rin-Sin and Tsutomu Miyazawa, and music composed by Yasuharu Takanashi. The series aired on AT-X from May 17 to 31, 2022, and ran for three episodes. The theme song is "Proud Stars" by Konomi Suzuki.

Series overview

Episode list

Ikki Tousen (2003)

Ikki Tousen: Dragon Destiny (2007)

Ikki Tousen: Great Guardians (2008)

Ikki Tousen: Xtreme Xecutor (2010)

Shin Ikki Tousen (2022)

OVAs

Ikki Tousen: Shugaku Toshi Keppu-roku (2011)

Ikki Tousen: Extravaganza Epoch (2014)

Ikki Tousen: Western Wolves (2019)

Notes

References

External links

Official anime website 
Official Dragon Destiny website 
Official Great Guardians website 
Official Xtreme Xecutor website 
Ikki Tousen at Funimation
Ikki Tousen at MVM Films
Ikki Tousen at Madman Entertainment
Ikki Tousen: Dragon Destiny at Media Blasters

Ikki Tousen
Ikki Tousen